Hamburg-Eimsbüttel is an electoral constituency (German: Wahlkreis) represented in the Bundestag. It elects one member via first-past-the-post voting. Under the current constituency numbering system, it is designated as constituency 20. It is located in northwestern Hamburg, comprising the Eimsbüttel borough.

Hamburg-Eimsbüttel was created for the inaugural 1949 federal election. Since 2021, it has been represented by Till Steffen of the Alliance 90/The Greens.

Geography
Hamburg-Eimsbüttel is located in northwestern Hamburg. As of the 2021 federal election, it is coterminous with the borough of Eimsbüttel.

History
Hamburg-Eimsbüttel was created in 1949, then known as Hamburg III. From 1965 through 1976, it was simply named Eimsbüttel. It acquired its current name in the 1980 election. In the inaugural Bundestag election, it was Hamburg constituency 1 in the numbering system. From 1953 through 1961, it was number 17. From 1965 through 1998, it was number 14. From 2002 through 2009, it was number 21. Since 2013, it has been constituency 20.

Originally, it comprised the entirety of the Eimsbüttel borough with the exception of the quarters of Rotherbaum, Harvestehude, and Hoheluft-West, and with the Ortsteile of Altona-Nord/Ost und Altona-Nord/Nord from the quarter of Altona-Nord. Since the 1965 election, it has been coterminous with the Eimsbüttel borough.

Members
The constituency has been held by the Social Democratic Party (SPD) during all but three Bundestag terms since 1949; it returned a representative from the SPD in every federal election from 1957 until 2009. Its first representative was Peter Blachstein of the SPD. In 1953, the constituency was won by Fritz Becker of the German Party (DP), who served for a single term. Blachstein won the constituency back for the SPD in 1957. In 1969, he was succeeded by Wilhelm Nölling, who was in turn succeeded in 1976 by Peter Paterna, who served until 1994, and then by Angelika Mertens until 2002. Niels Annen won the constituency in 2005. In 2009, Rüdiger Kruse of the Christian Democratic Union (CDU) became the first non-SPD member since 1953; he was defeated in 2013 by Niels Annen, who was re-elected in 2017. In 2021, Till Steffen of the Greens won the constituency.

Election results

2021 election

2017 election

2013 election

2009 election

References

Federal electoral districts in Hamburg
1949 establishments in West Germany
Constituencies established in 1949